Mickey's Mix-Up is a 1929 short film in Larry Darmour's Mickey McGuire series starring a young Mickey Rooney. Directed by Albert Herman, the two-reel short was released to theaters on October 13, 1929 by RKO.

Plot
After losing a court case to Mickey, Stinkie Davis has to let Mickey and the Scorpions put on a show in his mother's parlor.

Cast
Mickey Rooney - Mickey McGuire
Jimmy Robinson - Hambone Johnson
Delia Bogard - Tomboy Taylor
Marvin Stephens - Katrink
Kendall McComas - Stinkie Davis

External links 
 

1929 films
1929 comedy films
American black-and-white films
Mickey McGuire short film series
1929 short films
American silent short films
American comedy short films
1920s American films
Silent American comedy films